Govindpur railway station is a Passenger Halt (PH) railway station on Howrah–Nagpur–Mumbai line under Chakradharpur railway division of South Eastern Railway zone. It is situated at Subash Nagar, Khankripara, Jamshedpur in East Singhbhum  district in the Indian state of Jharkhand. It is only  from Tatanagar Junction.

References

Railway stations in East Singhbhum district
Chakradharpur railway division